Kodikulam is a panchayath in the Idukki district of Kerala state in India. It is about 12 kilometers east of Thodupuzha, the nearest town.

Population
Kodikulam is a part of Thodupuzha taluk  and the main population centers are East kodikulam, West Kodikulam, Parappuzha, Thennathoor, Thalakkampuram, Chalakkamukku, Koduvely, Vellamchira and Vazhakkala. The population is a mix of Hindus, Christians and Muslims. Kodikulam is divided into two - the eastern part is named Kizhake Kodikulam and the western Padinjare Kodikulam.

Economy
It is part of the agrarian country side of Kerala. Rubber plantations are the main industry in this panchayat.

Temples
There are three famous temples located in Kodikulam. First one is Thrikkovil Subrahmania temple at West Kodikulam, second one is Sri Chandrapillil Devi Kshetram, under the management of NSS Karayogam, situated on the bank of a tributary to kaliyar river at west kodikulam, and the third is anchakulam bhagavathy temple.

Villages in Idukki district